Meryem Aboulouafa is a Moroccan singer-songwriter from Casablanca. Her sound is characterized by atmospheric vocals and it draws influence from French pop, American rock, and Middle Eastern folk music.

Biography 
Meryem Aboulouafa is from Casablanca, Morocco. When she was young, she attended classes at a conservatory where she learned solfège, guitar, and piano. She would write poems in French and Arabic. She has a background in interior design. 

Her father introduced her to the music of his time, and she grew up listening to Pink Floyd, The Beatles, Bob Dylan, Georges Brassens, Jacques Brel, Nina Simone, and Édith Piaf. She has expressed interest in the music of Thom Yorke, Fairouz, Benjamin Clementine, Majida El Roumi, and Björk; the lyrics of Matthew Bellamy and Tania Saleh; and the production of Max Richter and Brian Eno. She also admires the directors Tim Burton and Nadine Labaki for their soundtracks.

She performed at the Jazzablanca festival in 2017. 

Her debut album, Meryem, was released by Animal 63, May 29, 2020.

References 

Musicians from Casablanca
Women singer-songwriters
21st-century Moroccan women singers
Moroccan songwriters
Year of birth missing (living people)
Living people